The phrase wood anemone is used in common names for several closely related species of flowering plants in genus Anemonoides, including:

 Anemonoides nemorosa, the wood anemone in Europe and Asia
 Anemonoides quinquefolia, the wood anemone in North America
 Anemonoides oregana, the western wood anemone in North America
 Anemonoides ranunculoides, the yellow wood anemone in Europe and Asia

Anemonoides